The Open Water Swimming competition at the 2009 World Aquatics Championships were held from 21 to 25 July at the beach of Ostia in Rome.

Schedule

Note: Originally, the Open water events were scheduled to occur on Sunday, July 19 (5K), Tuesday, July 21 (women's 10K) and Thursday, July 23 (women's 25K); however the FINA Bureau on July 18, 2009, altered the open water schedule due to weather conditions in Ostia.

Medal table

Medal summary

Men

Women

References
 results by omega

 
2009 in swimming
2009 World Aquatics Championships
Open water swimming at the World Aquatics Championships